Vladeta Ristić (5 March 1922 – 18 December 1971) was a Yugoslav rower. He competed in the men's coxed pair event at the 1948 Summer Olympics.

References

1922 births
1971 deaths
Yugoslav male rowers
Olympic rowers of Yugoslavia
Rowers at the 1948 Summer Olympics
Place of birth missing